Issa Kassim Issa (18 January 1957 – 18 December 2021), known as Baharia, was a Tanzanian politician.  From 2005 to 2010, he represented the Mpendae constituency in the National Assembly of Tanzania as a member of the Chama Cha Mapinduzi (CCM) party, having joined CCM in 1977.

He was born in Uroa in 1957 and died in hospital in Dar es Salaam in 2021.

See also
List of Tanzania National Assembly members

References

1957 births
2021 deaths
Tanzanian politicians
Zanzibari politicians
Chama Cha Mapinduzi politicians
Members of the National Assembly (Tanzania)